Motta Santa Lucia is a comune and town in the province of Catanzaro,  Calabria, southern Italy.

References

Sources
 Imperio Assisi et al., Decollatura e Motta S. Lucia: due comunità del Reventino, Decollatura: Grafica Reventino, 1980.

Cities and towns in Calabria